In 1892, the Hawaiian National Liberal Party, also known as the National Liberal Party of the Hawaiian Kingdom (generally known as just the "Liberal Party"), was a political party of the Kingdom of Hawaii near its end.

Ideology

Liberal nationalism
The party's liberal nationalist program was similar to that of the European National Liberal parties during the 1800s. In its platform, the Hawaiian Liberal Party stated that, "We deem that all Government should be founded on the principles of Liberty, Equality, and Fraternity; we hold that all me are born free and equal before the law and are endowed with inalienable rights to life, to liberty, to property, to the pursuit of happiness..." They also expressed revisions to international treaties and aiding Native Hawaiians in acquiring farmland and homesteads.

Progressivism
The Liberal Party were economically progressive, continuing from their platform "…and to self-protection against arbitrary concentration of power, irresponsible wealth, and unfair competition." Liberals preferred progressive taxation by raising taxes for organizations and the rich, while giving tax exemptions and aid to the poor. Other goals were to provide the public with economic protection and reduce the power of "monopolies, trusts and privileges of special classes".

History
It was established in January 1892 as a radical offshoot of the moderate National Reform Party. Its first president was John Edward Bush and its vice president was Joseph K. Nawahi. After an October special election in 1892, the party ousted Bush and elected Nawahi president and John K. Prendergast his vice president. Nawahi was considered more level-headed than Bush and Nawahi prompted Liberals to work with the National Reformers to break the impasse in the three-way split of the legislature.

The Liberal
The Liberal Party had their own newsletter named The Liberal.

International Rifle Association
The Liberal Party also had their own gun club, the International Rifle Association, similar to a political militia.

See also
 National Reform Party (Hawaii)

References

Sources

National Liberal
Political parties established in 1892
 
1892 establishments in Hawaii